This is a list of diplomatic missions in Pakistan. There are currently 81 diplomatic missions located Islamabad, most of which are in the Diplomatic Enclave. Many countries maintain consulates in other Pakistani cities. Several countries have non-resident embassies accredited from other foreign capitals, such as Abu Dhabi, Ankara, Riyadh and Tehran.

This listing excludes honorary consulates.

Diplomatic missions in Islamabad

Embassies and High Commissions

Other missions or delegations 
 (Delegation)
 (Representative Office)

to be opened

Consular missions

Karachi 

 (Deputy High Commission)

 (Consulate)

 (Consulate General)

 (Consulate-General)
 (Deputy High Commission)
 (Consulate-General)

Lahore 

 (Consulate-General)

Peshawar 

 (Consulate General)

Quetta

Accredited embassies 

Resident in Abu Dhabi, United Arab Emirates:

Resident in Ankara, Turkey:

 

Resident in Riyadh, Saudi Arabia:

Resident in Tehran, Iran:

  

 

Resident elsewhere:

 (Dhaka)
 (Doha)
 (New Delhi)
 (Oslo)
 (Beijing)
 (Port Louis)
 (Kuwait City)
 (Valletta)
 (Beijing)
 (Cairo)
 (Kuwait City)
 (Canberra)

Former embassies

See also 
 Foreign relations of Pakistan
 List of diplomatic missions of Pakistan
 List of diplomatic missions in Karachi
 Visa requirements for Pakistani citizens

References

External links 
 Ministry of Foreign Affairs of Pakistan
 Foreign missions in Pakistan

 
Pakistan
Diplomatic missions in Pakistan